The Latrobe Football Club is an Australian rules football club based in the town of Latrobe in northern Tasmania. The club competed in the North West Football Union throughout the competition's entire existence from 1910 until 1986, and has competed in its successor, the North West Football League, since 1987. Latrobe was one of the most successful NWFU clubs, and its tally of 12 premierships is a joint record shared with Burnie and Ulverstone. It was the only club to win four successive NWFU premierships, achieved from 1969 to 1972. In 2013, it became the first Tasmanian club outside of the State League to be inducted into the Tasmanian Football Hall of Fame.

History

During their time in the NWFU, Latrobe were known as the "Diehards" and had royal blue and red as their club colours. The club was formed on the 19 June 1881 and they played local football before joining the NWFA in 1894. They continued in the NWFA until 1908 where after a fallout with the NWFA executive they helped formed the NWFL in 1909. this turned into the NWFU IN 1910. They claimed premierships in 1891, 1892 in local competitions and a NWFA premiership in 1907.

In 1910, Latrobe were one of the foundation members of the NWFU and were premiers in just their fourth season. They had one of their strongest era in the 1920, appearing in every Grand Final from 1920 to 1924 and were to have a particularly successful team in the early 1930s winning three of the four premiership titles on offer between 1930 and 1933, only missing out in 1932 when they were losing Grand Finalists. The club had fielded two different teams in the 1931 season, Latrobe Country and Latrobe Town, to fill a spot vacated by Devonport's withdrawal, but merged again for the finals series.

After their 1933 success, the Diehards didn't win another NWFU premierships for 36 years, they began building a strong team in the 1960s, highlighted by the fact that every Wander Medal between 1964 and 1971 was won by a Latrobe player. This culminated in their drought breaking Grand Final win in 1969 under captain-coach Darrel Baldock, who then steered Latrobe to the next three premierships.

Latrobe won the Tasmanian State Premiership in 1970 when they defeated Clarence by 35 points at Devonport Oval. Latrobe also reached the Tasmanian State Premiership decider in 1971 and 1972 but lost to Sandy Bay and City-South respectively.

The 1972 premiership was Latrobe's last in the NWFU. The club competed in the NWFU until it merged with the NTFA to form the Northern Tasmanian Football League in 1987, and has competed in that competition (which was renamed the North West Football League in 2015) since. It won its first NTFL premiership in 2010, ending a 38-year premiership drought across both competitions, by defeating Ulverstone by 30 points in the NTFL Grand Final after having previously lost the 1994 and 2000 Grand Finals to Ulverstone on both occasions. It was the first of three premierships won over four years from 2010 until 2013.

Club details
Home ground – Darrel Baldock Oval (Latrobe Recreation Ground)
Established – 19 June 1881
Playing colours – Navy blue and red
Emblem – Demons
Club theme song – "It's a Grand Old Flag" (Tune: "You're a Grand Old Flag")
Affiliations – NWFL (1882–1909) NWFU (1910–1986), NTFL/NWFL (1987–present)

Premiership titles
NWFL Premierships 
 1891, 1892, 1907

NWFU Premierships 
1913, 1920, 1922, 1924, 1926, 1930, 1931, 1933, 1969, 1970, 1971, 1972.

NTFL/NWFL Premierships
2010, 2011, 2013, 2016

Tasmanian State Premierships
1970.

Individual medal winners
Wander Medal winners 
 1948 – Dave Jeffrey
 1952 – Peter Gillam
 1956 – Joe Murphy
 1959 – Darrel Baldock
 1964 – Wally Clark
 1965 – Len Lawson
 1966 – Bob Hickman
 1967 – Bob Hickman
 1968 – Brian Waters
 1969 – Darrel Baldock
 1970 – John Jillard
 1971 – John Jillard

Ovaltine Medal winners 
 Nil

Pivot Medal winners 
 Nil

Darrel Baldock Medal winners 
 2009 – Gavin Woodcock
 2013 - Josh Holland
 2014 - Josh Holland (joint winner)

All Australian players
 1961 - Darrel Baldock

Competition leading goalkickers
NWFU leading goalkickers 
 1920 – H. Hicks (Not available)
 1921 – H. Hicks (Not available)
 1922 – H. Hicks (39)
 1937 – N. Horne (71)
 1938 – N. Horne (61)
 1939 – N. Horne (84)
 1954 – A. Cole (97)
 1970 – R. (Ned) Gillam (83)
 1986 – Tom Honner (85)

NTFL/NWFL leading goalkickers
 1989 – Mark Williams (132)
 1994 – Terry Keays (117)
 2000 – S. French (42)
 2011 - B. Deverall (77)
 2012 - B. Deverall (106)
 2013 - A.Jeffrey (67)
 2016 - Ryan Keep (103)

Club records
Club record score 
 38.22 (250) v Penguin 9.6 (60) in 2004

Club record games holder
 Rod Butler (324)

Club record match attendance
 11,329 – Latrobe v Sandy Bay at North Hobart Oval on 2 October 1971 for the Tasmanian State Premiership Final.

References

External links
Full Points Footy: Latrobe

Australian rules football clubs in Tasmania
1881 establishments in Australia
Australian rules football clubs established in 1881
North West Football League clubs